The following is a timeline of the history of the city of Tbilisi, Georgia.

Prior to 13th century

 4th C. CE – Narikala Fortress built.
  – First Sasanian officials with the title marzban ("margrave") take up residence in Tbilisi.
 534 CE – Anchiskhati Basilica built (approximate date).
 6th C. – Capital of Caucasian Iberia moves to Tbilisi from Mtskheta.
 570 – Persians in power.
 626 – Town besieged by Greeks.
 627 – Town sacked by Byzantine/Khazar forces.
 639 – Sioni Cathedral built (approximate date).
 653 – Occupation by Arab leader Khabib Ibn-Maslama.
 736 – Arab Emirate of Tbilisi is established.
 764 – Town sacked by Khazars.
 828 – Town besieged by Khazars.
 851 – Town besieged by Arabs.
 853 – Town besieged by forces of Arab Bugha Al-Turki.
 1029 - Svetitskhoveli Cathedral rebuilt.
 1068 – Town sacked by forces of Seljuk Turk Alp Arslan.
 1122 – David IV of Georgia comes to power; relocates capital to Tbilisi from Kutaisi.

13th–17th centuries
 1226 – City sacked by forces of Khwarazmian Jalal ad-Din Mingburnu.
 1236 – Mongols in power.
 1251 – Cathedral of Saint George built.
 1284 – Metekhi Church of Assumption built.
 1329 – Catholic diocese established.
 1366 – Plague.
 1395 – City besieged by Timur.
 1444 – City sacked by forces of Turcoman Jahan Shah.
 1467 – Norashen Church founded.
 1477 – Aq Qoyunlu in power.
 1480 – Armenian Cathedral rebuilt.
 1522 – Persians in power.
 1655 – Khojivank church built.
 1668 – Earthquake.

18th century

 1711 – Church of the Holy Seal built.
 1717 – Zrkinyants St. Gevorg (church) built.
 1727 – Upper Betlemi Church built.
 1729 – Jigrashen Avetyats Church built (approximate date).
 1737 – Saint Sargis Church built.
 1753 – Church of Saint George (Kldisubani) built.
 1756 – Saint Gevorg of Mughni Church rebuilt.
 1775 – Church of the Red Gospel built (approximate date).
 1778 – Krtsanis Tsiranavor Surb Astvatsatsin (church) rebuilt.
 1788 – Kamoyants St. Gevorg (church) built.
 1793 – Armenian school opens.
 1795 – City sacked by forces of Persian Mohammad Khan Qajar.
 1799 – Russians in power.

19th century
 1801 – City becomes part of Russia.
 1808 - Cathedral of the Assumption of the Virgin building completed.
 1817 – Tbilisi Spiritual Seminary established.
 1824 – Nersisyan School established.
 1830 –  (school) founded.
 1840 – Ivan Izmiryants becomes mayor.
 1845 – Botanical Garden established.
 1846 – National Parliamentary Library of Georgia established.
 1848 – City becomes part of Tiflis Governorate.

 1851 – Opera house and  built.
 1858 – Mushthaid Garden opens.
 1866 – Droeba newspaper begins publication.
 1867 – Caucasian Museum founded.
 1868 – Population: 61,000.
 1870 – Lower Bethlehemi Church built.
 1872
 Railway station built.
 Mshak newspaper begins publication.
 Alexander Nevsky Cathedral built.
 1877 – St. Peter and St. Paul's Church completed.
 1879 – City Assembly building remodelled.
 1883 – Population: 104,024.
 1885 – Military Museum built.
 1887 – Rustaveli Theatre completed.
 1890 – Armenian Revolutionary Federation founded in Tiflis.
 1894 – Supreme Court of Georgia building built.
 1897
 Garrison Cathedral built.
 Population: 159,862.
 1899 – Alexandropol-Tiflis railway begins operating.

20th century
 1902 – Erivan-Tiflis railway begins operating.
 1907 – 26 June: Bank robbery.
 1909
  opens.
 Alexander Khatisyan becomes mayor.
 1913 – Population: 327,800.
 1917
 Tiflis Governorate abolished.
 Conservatoire and Armenian National Council of Tiflis founded.

 1918
 February–May: City becomes capital of Transcaucasian Democratic Federative Republic.
 May: City becomes capital of Democratic Republic of Georgia.
 Tbilisi State University and Tbilisi Medical Institute established.
 Benia Chkhikvishvili becomes mayor.
 National Archives of Georgia headquartered in Tbilisi.
 1919 – Museum of Georgia active.
 1920 – National Art Gallery opens.
 1921 – February: City besieged by Bolshevist Russian Red Army.
 1922
 City becomes capital of Transcaucasian Socialist Federative Soviet Republic.
 Art Academy founded.
 1925 – FC Dinamo Tbilisi (football club) formed.
 1927 – Tiflis Zoopark founded.
 1928 – Georgian Politechnical Institute established.
 1929 – Mtatsminda Pantheon (cemetery) established.
 1930
 Museum of Literature founded.
 Marjanishvili Theater relocates to Tbilisi.
 1931 – Zarya Vostoka building constructed.
 1933 – Jewish Historic-Ethnographic Museum founded.
 1935 – Central Stadium opens.
 1936
 City becomes capital of Georgian Soviet Socialist Republic.
 City name changed from "Tiflis" to "Tbilisi."
 1939
 Rustaveli cinema opens.
 Didube Pantheon (cemetery) established.
 1941
 Georgian SSR Academy of Sciences and Tbilisi Aircraft State Association established.
 1946 – Vake Park opens.
 1950 – Art Museum of Georgia active.
 1951 –  rebuilt.
 1952 – Airport and  built.
 1953 –  built.
 1956 – March: Anti-de-Stalinization  demonstrations.
 1958 – Institute of Manuscripts established.

 1961 – Tbilisi Sports Palace opens.
 1965 – Tbilisi co-hosts the EuroBasket 1965.
 1966
 Tbilisi Metro begins operating.
 Baratashvili Bridge constructed.
 Open Air Museum of Ethnography founded.
 1967 – Hotel Iveria built.
 1970 – Saburtalo Pantheon (cemetery) established.
 1972 – Tbilisi TV Broadcasting Tower erected.
 1973 - Tbilisi National Park established
 1974 – Human Rights Defence Group formed.
 1975
 Tbilisi Roads Ministry Building constructed.
 Bank of Georgia headquarters built.
 1976 – Boris Paichadze Stadium opens.
 1978 – April: Demonstrations about constitutional status of Georgian language.
 1979
 Tbilisoba begins.
 Population: 1,052,734.
 1980 – March: Rock music festival held.
 1983 – Republic Square constructed.
 1984
 Wedding Palace built.
 December: Gas explosion.
 1989
 9 April: Anti-Soviet Demonstration quashed.
 13 April: Church of the Red Gospel destroyed.

1990s

 1990
 June: Aerial tramway accident.
 Population: 1,268,000 (estimate).
 1991
 April: Georgia declares independence from USSR.
 December: Conflict between pro-Gamsakhurdia and Opposition forces.
 Georgian Academy of Agrarian Sciences founded.
 Ordzhonikidze Square renamed "."
 1992
 January: Conflict between pro-Gamsakhurdia and Opposition forces.
 Otar Litanishvili becomes mayor.
 1993
 Konstantine Gabashvili becomes mayor, succeeded by Nikoloz Lekishvili.
 Apostolic Administration of the Caucasus established and headquartered in Tbilisi.
 1995
 Abkhazian Regional Academy of Sciences founded.
 Badri Shoshitaishvili becomes mayor.
 1996 – National Parliamentary Library of Georgia headquartered in city.
 1998
 Vano Zodelava becomes mayor.
 Telasi privatized.
 2000 – Basiani choir formed.

21st century

 2001
 Mikheil Meskhi Stadium built.
 TbilAviaMsheni airline based in Tbilisi.
 2002
 April 25: The 4.8  Tbilisi earthquake shook the area with a maximum MSK intensity of VII–VIII (Very strong – Damaging), causing 5–6 deaths and 52–70 injuries. Damage was estimated at $160–350 million.
 Tbilisi Aircraft Manufacturing privatized.
 Population: 1,081,679.
 2003 – November: Rose Revolution.
 2004
 Holy Trinity Cathedral (Sameba) built.
 Zurab Tchiaberashvili becomes mayor.
 Caucasus University established.
 2005 – Giorgi Ugulava becomes mayor.
 2006
 March: Protest against 2006 Russian ban of Moldovan and Georgian wines.
 Baku–Tbilisi–Ceyhan pipeline in operation.
 National Science Library (Georgia), Scouts of Tbilisi, and Museum of Soviet Occupation established.
 Freedom Monument erected in Freedom Square.
 2007
 Demonstrations against Saakashvili regime.
 Old Tbilisi raion established.
 Free University of Tbilisi and  founded.
 2008 – August: Bombing by Russian Air Force during Russo-Georgian War.
 2009
 Demonstrations against Saakashvili regime.
 Tbilisi Open Air (music festival), Tbilisi International Festival of Theatre, and Tbilisi Fashion Week begin.
 April: Tbilisi hosts the 2009 European Judo Championships.
 2010 – Bridge of Peace (pedestrian bridge) built.
 2011 – May: Demonstration against Saakashvili regime.
 2012
 13 February: Bomb attempt foiled.
 April: Lech Kaczyński monument unveiled.
 May: Anti-government demonstration.
 Population: 1,473,551.
 2013 – Tbilisi hosts the 2013 European Wrestling Championships.
 2014 – Sister city partnership signed between Tbilisi and Lublin, Poland.

 2015
 April: Tbilisi hosts the 2015 European Weightlifting Championships.
 14 June: Flooding in the Vere river results in at least 12 deaths and devastates the city's zoo.
 2017
 Tbilisi International Airport established.
 June: Tbilisi hosts the 2017 European Fencing Championships.
 September-October: Tbilisi co-hosts the 2017 Women's European Volleyball Championship.
 2018 – 5 November: Polish Library and Polish Institute in Tbilisi opened (see also Georgia–Poland relations).
 2022 – Tbilisi co-hosts the EuroBasket 2022.

See also
 History of Tbilisi
 Other names of Tbilisi
 List of mayors of Tbilisi
 List of museums in Tbilisi
 Timeline of Georgian history

References

This article incorporates information from the Georgian Wikipedia and German Wikipedia.

Bibliography

Published in 19th century
 
 
 
 

Published in 20th century
 
 
 
 
 
 

Published in 21st century

External links

 
Tbilisi
Tbilisi
Tbilisi
Years in Georgia (country)
Tbilisi